Maximilian Carlo Martini (born December 11, 1969) is an American actor, writer, and director known for his roles as Corporal Fred Henderson in Saving Private Ryan, Wiley in Level 9, First Sergeant Sid Wojo in The Great Raid, and as Master Sergeant Mack Gerhardt in the military drama television series The Unit. He also starred in the film 13 Hours: The Secret Soldiers of Benghazi as Mark Geist.

Early life and education
Martini's father, Raffaele Martini Pandozy, a sculptor and reformist artist, was born in Rome. Martini's mother, Patricia (née Dunne) Martini Margolin, was a private investigator and parole officer. He has two siblings: actor/producer Christopher Martini and costume designer Michelle Martini. His stepfather, Stuart Margolin, was a director and actor. Martini attended St. Michaels University School in Victoria, Canada.

Martini moved to New York City and studied acting, first at the Neighborhood Playhouse, and then at Michael Howard Studios. He subsequently attended the School of Visual Arts in Manhattan, and received a B.F.A. in painting and sculpture.

Career

Film
After college, Martini found steady work in film and television projects. His film roles include co-starring opposite Jodie Foster in Robert Zemeckis's Contact as Willie, a fellow scientist with an affinity for brightly colored shirts, and sharing the screen with Tom Hanks and Matt Damon in Saving Private Ryan as Corporal Henderson, ranking NCO of Pfc. James Ryan's unit, who helped Cpt. John H. Miller and his men in the brutal final shootout of the film. Martini later co-starred in John Dahl's The Great Raid as 1st Sgt. Sid Wojo.

He appeared in smaller independent films, working with Calista Flockhart in Jane Doe, Chris Penn and Jeffrey Wright in Cement and in the 2000 Sundance Film Festival fave Backroads. In 1999, Martini wrote, co-directed and starred in Desert Son. His younger brother, Christopher, co-directed the film with him, and his sister, Michelle, served as costume designer. He had a recurring role in the ABC drama Castle.  In 2011, the Noor Iranian Film Festival in Los Angeles invited him to participate as an official festival judge. In 2013, he played the role of the U.S. Navy SEAL commander in Paul Greengrass's Academy Award-nominated film Captain Phillips.

In 2013, Guillermo del Toro cast Martini and Rob Kazinsky as the Australian father-son pilot duo in Pacific Rim. In 2014, Martini was cast in  Legendary Pictures' supernatural thriller Spectral. Martini played Christian Grey's bodyguard in the film Fifty Shades of Grey (2015), and its two sequels. In 2016, Martini portrayed Mark "Oz" Geist in Michael Bay's 13 Hours: The Secret Soldiers of Benghazi.

Martini made his directorial debut in 2019 with a military drama. Sgt. Will Gardner, in which he also starred as Sgt. Will Gardner.

Television and theater
Martini's television credits include a lead role in the Sci-fi Channel's Emmy nominated mini-series Taken and appearances as Agent Steve Goodrich on the second season of 24. He was also cast in X-Files creator Chris Carter's Harsh Realm, and had a recurring role in the Canadian series Da Vinci's Inquest. He also appeared in Lie to Me.

After memorable guest-star turns in popular series, including Numb3rs, Walker Texas Ranger, CSI: Crime Scene Investigation and CSI: Miami, Martini landed a lead role in The Unit, a series about a tier-1 US Army special operations team created by David Mamet and produced by Shawn Ryan of The Shield. Martini remains active in the theater, having co-founded the Theatre North Collaborative in New York City, a company of American and Canadian actors dedicated solely to producing new works from both sides of the border. In 2011, he appeared in an episode of Criminal Minds, in which he played a Navy SEAL named Luke Dolan.

In 2015, Martini starred as the title character in Amazon Studios' Western series Edge, written and directed by Shane Black.

In April 2018, Martini was cast in the Netflix horror-drama series The Order.

In August 2022, Martini joined the cast in the second season of the Amazon Freevee Bosch spin-off series Bosch: Legacy as Detective Don Ellis, a hardened vice cop in the LAPD.

Filmography

Film

Television

References

External links

 

1969 births
American male film actors
American people of Italian descent
American male stage actors
American male television actors
Living people
Male actors from New York (state)
People of Lazian descent